The Old Man and the Sea is a short novel by Ernest Hemingway. It may also refer to:

 The Old Man and the Sea (1958 film), directed by John Sturges, starring Spencer Tracy
 The Old Man and the Sea (1990 film), television film starring Anthony Quinn
 The Old Man and the Sea (1999 film), paint-on-glass-animated short film directed by Aleksandr Petrov
 "The Old Man and the Sea", a 2005 episode of the television series Will & Grace (season 8)